The lesser hamster-rat or long-tailed pouched rat (Beamys hindei) is a species of rodent in the family Nesomyidae. It is found in Kenya and Tanzania. Its natural habitat is subtropical or tropical moist lowland coastal forests. It is threatened by habitat loss. Oldfield Thomas named it in honor of Sidney Langford Hinde, a British officer and recreational naturalist.

References

Sources
 Howell, K. & Oguge, N. 2004.  Beamys hindei.   2006 IUCN Red List of Threatened Species.  Downloaded on 19 July 2007.
Musser, G. G. and M. D. Carleton. 2005. Superfamily Muroidea. pp. 894–1531 in Mammal Species of the World a Taxonomic and Geographic Reference. D. E. Wilson and D. M. Reeder eds. Johns Hopkins University Press, Baltimore.

Beamys
Mammals described in 1909
Taxa named by Oldfield Thomas
Taxonomy articles created by Polbot